Liz Smith  (born 25 September 1975) is a Canadian soccer player who played as a midfielder for the Canada women's national soccer team. She was part of the team at the 1999 FIFA Women's World Cup.

References

External links
 
 

1975 births
Living people
Soccer players from Edmonton
Canadian women's soccer players
Canada women's international soccer players
1999 FIFA Women's World Cup players
Women's association football midfielders